The Ostrekoff Jewels is a 1932 thriller novel by the British writer E. Phillips Oppenheim. It was published in the United States by Little, Brown.

Synopsis
In Petrograd shortly after the Russian Revolution Princess Ostrekoff approaches an American diplomat Wilfred Haven and asks him to smuggle out the family's priceless jewels to their daughter in London.

References

Bibliography
 Magill, Frank Northen. Critical Survey of Mystery and Detective Fiction: Authors, Volume 1. Salem Press, 1988.
 Reilly, John M. Twentieth Century Crime & Mystery Writers. Springer, 2015.
 Server, Lee. Encyclopedia of Pulp Fiction Writers. Infobase Publishing, 2014.

1932 British novels
Novels by E. Phillips Oppenheim
British thriller novels
Novels set in Russia
Novels set in the 1910s
Novels set in London
Hodder & Stoughton books